No Name is a census-designated place (CDP) in and governed by Garfield County, Colorado, United States. The CDP is a part of the Glenwood Springs, CO Micropolitan Statistical Area. The population of the No Name CDP was 123 at the United States Census 2010. The Glenwood Springs post office (Zip Code 81601) serves the area.

Geography
No Name is located east of Glenwood Springs, off Exit 119 of Interstate 70/U.S. Route 6 (I-70/US 6}}in Glenwood Canyon. It is named for No Name Creek and No Name Canyon. The No-Name was one of the boats on John Wesley Powell's expedition in 1869 to map out the COLORADO River along with  the other boats including the Emma Dean, Kitty Clyde's sister and Maid of the Canyon. The No Name Tunnel of I-70/US 6 is nearby. It has frequently been noted on lists of unusual place names.

The exit sign for No Name is visible in passing in the 1971 film Vanishing Point.

Demographics

See also

 List of census-designated places in Colorado

References

External links

 The Naming of No Name
 Glenwood Canyon
 Photo of No Name Canyon
 Garfield County website

Census-designated places in Garfield County, Colorado
Census-designated places in Colorado